Ivan Gladyshev (born 13 August 2001) is a Russian racing cyclist. In November 2020, he competed in the men's team sprint event at the 2020 UEC European Track Championships in Plovdiv, Bulgaria, winning the gold medal.

References

External links
 

2001 births
Living people
Russian male cyclists
Place of birth missing (living people)
Cyclists at the 2020 Summer Olympics
Olympic cyclists of Russia